In traditional Persian architecture, a kucheh or koocheh, is a narrow especially designed alley. Remnants of it are  still seen in modern Iran and regional countries.

Before modernization, Persia's old city fabric was composed of these narrow winding streets, often made with high walls of adobe and brick, and often roofed at intervals. This form of urban design, which was commonplace in Persia, is an optimal form of desert architecture that minimizes desert expansion and the effects of dust storms. It also maximizes daytime shading, and insulates the “fabric” from severe winter temperatures.

References

Architecture in Iran
Pedestrian infrastructure
Islamic architectural elements
Islamic architecture
Streets by type
Passive cooling
Passive ventilation